The Marranunggu are an Aboriginal Australian people and language group, of the Northern Territory.

Language

Marranunggu is classified as one of the dialects of the Marranji group of the Western Daly languages, together with Menhthe and Emmi.

Country
The Marranunggu's traditional lands were south of the Daly River

Alternative names
 Marranunga
 Maranunggo
 Marranunngo
 Maranunga
 Maranungo

Notes

Citations

Sources

 

Aboriginal peoples of the Northern Territory